BLSP  may refer to:
Barnegat Lighthouse State Park, New Jersey, USA
Bear Lake State Park (Utah), USA
Beaver Lake State Park (North Dakota), USA
Bharat Lok Shiksha Parishad, a charity in India
British Light Steel Pressings, a former company
 Building Literacy in Sudan Project, part of the International Extension College
Business Leaders for Sensible Priorities, a  nonprofit organization composed of 700 business leaders